Muhammad bin Abdullah Al-Sabil (1924 - 17 December 2012), was born in the city of Bukayriyah in the Al-Qassim Province. He was the imam and preacher of the Masjid al-Haram for forty-four years in general, a member of the Council of Senior Scholars, and a member of the Islamic Fiqh Assembly, and the head of the Al-Masjid al-Haram and Masjid al-Nabawi affairs, and the head of the Al-Haram Committee in the Kingdom of Saudi Arabia. He is one of the hostages who survived the incident of the Juhayman armed group storming the Great Mosque of Mecca, when the sabil was the imam, led the people in the Fajr prayer.

He made more than 100 advocacy trips outside the Kingdom, covering more than 50 countries, and authored 27 books.

Education 
He memorize the Quran and was  educated at the hands of his father and by Sheikh Abd al-Rahman al-Kuraides. At the age of fourteen, he improved the recitation of the Qur'an at the hands of Sheikh Saadi Yassin. He took legal knowledge from his brother Sheikh Abdul Aziz Al-Sabeel, Sheikh Muhammad Al-Muqbil and Sheikh Abdullah bin Humaid.

Career
Betweeb 1373 AH and 1385, Subail served as a supervisor at the Scientific Institute in Buraidah. He was appointed the imam, preacher and a teacher in Masjid al-Haram in 1385 AH, a position he served until 1429 AH. He also served as the head of teachers and observers in the presidency of religious supervision of the Grand Mosque. In 1393 AH, he became the Deputy General to the Head of Religious Supervision of the Grand Mosque. Subsequently he was made the head of the General Presidency for the affairs of the Grand Mosque and the Prophet's Mosque in 1411 AH.

Subail served as a member of the Council of Senior Scholars in the Kingdom of Saudi Arabia between 1413 AH and 1427 AH. He remained a member of  the Islamic Fiqh Council of the Muslim World League between 1397 AH and 1432 AH. He frequently participated in the Noor on the Path program on the Holy Quran Radio in Saudi Arabia. His students included Saleh Al-Fawzan, Abdulrahman bin Abdulaziz Al Kelya and Muqbil bin Hadi al-Wadi'i.

Subail laid the foundation stone of Jamia Asria in Jhelum, Pakistan in 1997.

Subail survived the attempted murder in the incident of storming the Grand Mosque, which was carried out allegedly by Juhayman and his followers in the year 1400 AH, where the imam was the salary for the dawn prayer, and the end of the prayer was the hour of the storming of the sanctuary.

Death 
He died on Monday, 3 Safar 1434 AH, corresponding to December 17, 2012.

References

External links
 

2012 deaths
1924 births
Saudi Arabian Quran reciters
People from Al-Qassim Province
People from Al Bukayriah